McKay is an unincorporated community in Umatilla County, Oregon, United States. Its name accompanies McKay Creek, which is named for Dr. William Cameron McKay, 
located in Umatilla County at North McKay Creek Road (County 1050 Rd.) on Ross Road.

It has been the site of discovery of ancient bird fossils.

References

See also
McKay Creek National Wildlife Refuge
McKay Reservoir
Pendleton, Oregon

Unincorporated communities in Umatilla County, Oregon
Unincorporated communities in Oregon